is a Japanese voice actor from Saitama Prefecture. He works at Production Baobab. Toriumi performed with other voice actors on the album Everybody's Christmas.

Voice Roles
Hazuki in Pocket Monsters
Dalida Lolaha Chandra II in Mobile Suit Gundam Seed
Masato Wakamatsu in Miyuki
Matsui in Kenichi: The Mightiest Disciple
Byakuya Matou in Fate/Zero
Wormhole in Stitch! ~The Mischievous Alien's Great Adventure~

Dubbing

Live-action
Andromeda, Seamus Zelazny Harper (Gordon Michael Woolvett)
Blow, Diego Delgado (Jordi Mollà)
Can't Hardly Wait, William Lichter (Charlie Korsmo)
The Fast and the Furious (2005 TV Asahi edition), Jesse (Chad Lindberg)
Gulliver's Travels, Hank (Romany Malco)
The Longest Yard, James "Caretaker" Farrell (Chris Rock)
The Man in the Iron Mask, Raoul (Peter Sarsgaard)
The Program, Lance Armstrong (Ben Foster)
Swing Kids, Arvid (Frank Whaley)
White Squall, Chuck Gieg (Scott Wolf)

Animation
Mr. Bogus, Bogus and Additional Voices
Wreck-It Ralph, Roy

References

Japanese male voice actors
Living people
Year of birth missing (living people)
Male voice actors from Saitama Prefecture
Production Baobab voice actors